Davon is a given name. Notable people with the name include:

Davon Coleman (born 1991), American football player
Davon Drew (born 1985), American football tight end who is currently a free agent
Davon Godchaux (born 1994), American football player
DaVon Hamilton (born 1997), American football player
Davon House (born 1989), American football cornerback for the Green Bay Packers
Davon Jefferson (born 1986), American professional basketball player in the Israeli Basketball Premier League
Davon Raubenheimer (born 1984), professional rugby union rugby player
Davon Williams (born 1972), former West Indian cricketer
Davon Williams (born 1989), Musician, Owner : Incorporated Minds Music Empire- IMME / D and A Entertainment Group / Trifecta Recordings

See also
Auf und davon – Mein Auslandstagebuch, German documentary television series, broadcast on VOX since 16 April 2007
Mehr davon (More of it) is a song by Die Toten Hosen
Mehr davon! Die Single-Box (More of it!) is a single box by the German punk band Die Toten Hosen
Mehr davon! Die Single-Box 1995–2000 (More of it!) is a single box by the German punk band Die Toten Hosen
Davron
Dolavon
Donavon (disambiguation)